Albert Nicholas (May 27, 1900 – September 3, 1973) was an American jazz clarinet player.

Career
Nicholas's primary instrument was the clarinet, which he studied with Lorenzo Tio in his hometown of New Orleans, Louisiana, United States. Late in the 1910s, he played with Buddy Petit, King Oliver, and Manuel Perez. He spent three years in the Merchant Marines and then joined Oliver in Chicago from 1925 to 1927. After time in East Asia and Egypt, he returned to New York City in 1928 and played with Luis Russell until 1933, playing there with Red Allen, Charlie Holmes, and J. C. Higginbotham. Later he played with Chick Webb, Louis Armstrong (with Russell) and Jelly Roll Morton.

The Dixieland jazz revival of the late 1940s reinvigorated his career; he played with Art Hodes, Bunk Johnson, and Kid Ory, and had a regular gig with Ralph Sutton in 1948. In 1953, he moved to France; except for recording sessions in the U.S. in 1959-60, he remained there for most of the rest of his life.

Nicholas died in Basle, Switzerland, in September 1973, at the age of 73.

Discography
 Albert Nicholas & Mezz Mezzrow (Jazztone, 1956)
 The Scobey Story Vol. 1 (Good Time Jazz, 1959)
 Albert Nicholas with Art Hodes' All-Star Stompers (Delmark, 1964)
 Albert's Blues (77 Records, 1966)
 Barney Bigard/Albert Nicholas (RCA, 1969)
 A Tribute to Jelly Roll Morton (Storyville, 1972)
 Albert Nicholas and The Traditional Jazz Studio (Supraphon, 1972)
 Albert Nicholas with Alan Elsdon's Band Vol. 1 (Jazzology, 1995)
 Albert Nicholas with Alan Elsdon's Band Vol. 2 (Jazzology, 1996)
 Story 1926–1947 (EPM, 1998)
 New Orleans Clarinet (Sanctuary, 2006)
 Albert Nicholas & Herb Hall (GHB, 2015)

References
Footnotes

General references
 Scott Yanow, [ Albert Nicholas] at AllMusic

External links

 .
 "Roger Richard talks to Albert Nicholas". Storyville.
 Albert Nicholas (1900-1973) at the Red Hot Jazz Archive

1900 births
1973 deaths
American jazz clarinetists
Delmark Records artists
20th-century American musicians
Jazz musicians from New Orleans